is a Japanese voice actress and singer. As a solo singer, she used the name hibiku before 2019. She is affiliated with Haikyō.

On July 7, 2021, it was announced Yamamura had tested positive for COVID-19. She recovered on July 14, 2021.

Biography

Filmography

Television animation
Kotatsu Neko (2009), Zero, Kurara
Mitsudomoe (2010), Tabuchi, Abukawa, Odeko
Mitsudomoe Zōryōchū! (2011), Tabuchi
Penguindrum (2011), Mari Fujishiro
Arata: The Legend (2013), Kikuri (Hime-Ou), Kannagi (young)
Arpeggio of Blue Steel: Ars Nova (2013), Haruna
Haganai Next (2013), Yōko Fuyuki
Atelier Escha & Logy: Alchemists of the Dusk Sky (2014), Chrone
Chikasugi Idol Akae-chan (2014), Momo
Robot Girls Z (2014), Belgas V5
Tribe Cool Crew (2014), Manabi Sakurazaka
Dance with Devils (2015), Maria Tachibana, Lindo Tachibana (child)
Go! Princess PreCure (2015), Kirara Amanogawa/Cure Twinkle
JoJo's Bizarre Adventure: Stardust Crusaders Egypt Arc (2015), Nukesaku (female face)
Mobile Suit Gundam: Iron-Blooded Orphans (2015), Eva Turbine
Noragami Aragoto (2015), Izanami
Seraph of the End (2015), Asuramaru
Seraph of the End: Battle in Nagoya (2015), Asuramaru
The Testament of Sister New Devil Burst (2015), Lukia
Tribe Cool Crew (2015), Mizuki's Mother
Wooser's Hand-to-Mouth Life: Phantasmagoric Arc (2015), Haruna
Anne Happy (2016), Hibiki Hagyū
Assassination Classroom (2016), Sakura Kiyashiki
Dimension W (2016), Twin Robots
Gate 2nd Season (2016), Noriko Mochizuki
Kiznaiver (2016), Noriko Sonozaki
Re:Zero − Starting Life in Another World (2016), Raksha Risch
Keijo (2016), Mio Kusakai
Kenka Bancho Otome: Girl Beats Boys (2017), Hinako Nakayama
Kamisama Minarai: Himitsu no Cocotama (2017), Hikari Chono, Cala
Hina Logi ~from Luck & Logic~, Nina Alexandrovna
Layton Mystery Tanteisha: Katori no Nazotoki File (2018–19), Geraldine Royer
Doreiku (2018), Eia Arakawa
Island (2018), Sara Garando 
GeGeGe no Kitarō 6th series (2018), Agnes 
The Magnificent Kotobuki (2019), Zara
Ultramarine Magmell (2019), Emilia
Cautious Hero: The Hero Is Overpowered but Overly Cautious (2019), Ariadoa
Beastars (2019), Mizuchi
Interspecies Reviewers (2020), Demia Duodectet
Peter Grill and the Philosopher's Time (2020), Lisa Alpacas
Smile Down the Runway (2020), Aoi Tsumura
Sakura Wars the Animation (2020), Azami Mochizuki
The Case Files of Jeweler Richard (2020), Young Richard
Warlords of Sigrdrifa (2020), Claudia Bruford
Seven Knights Revolution: Hero Successor (2021), Faria
Muv-Luv Alternative (2021), Mitsuki Hayase
Shadowverse Flame (2022), Itsuki Mitsutagawa
Ya Boy Kongming! (2022), Nanami Kuon
Peter Grill and the Philosopher's Time: Super Extra (2022), Lisa Alpacas
My Master Has No Tail (2022), Bunko
Heavenly Delusion (2023), Tokio
The Aristocrat's Otherworldly Adventure: Serving Gods Who Go Too Far (2023), Nina
The Legendary Hero Is Dead! (2023), Yuna
Liar Liar (2023), Ami Kagaya

Film
Arpeggio of Blue Steel: Ars Nova Cadenza (2015), Haruna
Arpeggio of Blue Steel: Ars Nova DC (2015), Haruna
Go! Princess Precure the Movie: Go! Go!! Splendid Triple Feature!!! (2015), Kirara Amanogawa/Cure Twinkle
Pretty Cure All Stars: Spring Carnival (2015), Kirara Amanogawa/Cure Twinkle
Pretty Cure All Stars: Singing with Everyone Miraculous Magic! (2016), Kirara Amanogawa/Cure Twinkle
Pretty Cure Dream Stars! (2017), Kirara Amanogawa/Cure Twinkle

Tokusatsu
Ultraman X (2015), Navigation voice/Announcements
Ultraman X The Movie (2016), Announcements
New Ultraman Retsuden (2016), X Devizer
Ultraman Geed (2017), Public evacuation announcement

Video games
Dream Club Gogo. (2014), Miyabi
Sōshū Senshinkan Gakuen Hachimyōjin (2014), Mizuki Sera
Asdivine Dios (2015), Minerva
Go! Princess PreCure: Sugar Ōkoku to Rokunin no Princess (2015), Kirara Amanogawa/Cure Twinkle
Utawarerumono: Futari no Hakuoro (2016), Shisu
Granblue Fantasy (2017), Leona
Sword Art Online: Fatal Bullet (2018), Musketeer X
Azur Lane (2017), USS Alabama (BB-60), KMS Ulrich von Hutten
Girls' Frontline (2019), Px4 Storm, 62 ShikiFire Emblem Heroes (2019), RineaSakura Wars (2019), Azami MochizukiArknights (2020), FlintLast Cloudia (2020), MaddineTouhou Spell Bubble (2020), Youmu KonpakuBlue Archive (2021), Chihiro KagamiStar Ocean: The Divine Force (2022), Lola Jornaus

DubbingAmbulance, Cam Thompson (Eiza González)Antiviral, Hannah Geist (Sarah Gadon)Before Midnight, Hank (Seamus Davey-Fitzpatrick), Nina (Charlotte Prior)Crimson Peak, Edith Cushing (Mia Wasikowska)Flight 7500, Suzy Lee (Jamie Chung)From Dusk till Dawn: The Series, Santanico Pandemonium / Kisa (Eiza González)The Frozen Ground, Debbie Peters (Gia Mantegna)Run Boy Run, Srulik Frydman / Jurek Staniak (Andrzej Tkacz)White House Farm'', Julie Mugford (Alexa Davies)

Discography

Singles

Mini-albums

Albums

References

External links
 Official agency profile 
 

1988 births
Living people
Anime musicians
Japanese video game actresses
Japanese voice actresses
Japanese women pop singers
Musicians from Fukuoka Prefecture
Tokyo Actor's Consumer's Cooperative Society voice actors
Voice actresses from Fukuoka Prefecture
21st-century Japanese actresses
21st-century Japanese women singers
21st-century Japanese singers